Israel López Hernández (born 29 September 1974) is a Mexican former professional footballer who played as a midfielder.

Club career 
Initially a right fullback who converted to the midfield during the prime years of his career, López made his debut at age 19 with UNAM in 1993. By the following year he was a starter in defense alongside players such as Claudio Suárez and went on to make 238 appearances for the club, but the middle and late 1990s were generally disappointing for Pumas. In 2001, he moved to Chivas and then joined Toluca in 2002. There he spent the most productive seasons of his career, moving into a three-man central midfield that also included Rafael García and playmaker Antonio Naelson. In his first season at the club, Toluca won the Apertura 2002 championship, and López scored in the final against Monarcas Morelia. He served as team captain in 2004 and won another championship in the Apertura 2005 campaign. In the following season López, a frequent scorer from free kicks, scored a career-high 6 goals. He joined Cruz Azul in 2006 before returning to Toluca for the Clausura 2008 season; he won the Apertura 2008 title, his third, with Toluca, but by now played less frequently. López departed Toluca in 2010 and spent his last top-flight seasons with Cruz Azul, Necaxa, Estudiantes Tecos, and Querétaro.

International career 
López also earned 26 caps for the Mexico national team. His first international match came on June 4, 2000 against Ireland in the U.S. Cup, playing in a squad filled mostly with fellow Pumas players. He returned to the team in 2003 on the strength of his performances with Toluca, appearing in four of Mexico's qualifying matches for the 2006 FIFA World Cup. López was on the preliminary list of players nominated for the World Cup squad, but he was one of three final cuts announced by coach Ricardo Antonio Lavolpe before the tournament. His final international match came against Ecuador in a 4-2 victory in Oakland, California on March 28, 2007.

He was part of the Mexico 2004 Olympic football team as an overage player that was eliminated in the first round, having finished third in group A behind group winners Mali and South Korea.

References

External links

1974 births
Living people
Mexican footballers
Mexico international footballers
Olympic footballers of Mexico
Footballers at the 2004 Summer Olympics
2005 CONCACAF Gold Cup players
Liga MX players
Club Universidad Nacional footballers
C.D. Guadalajara footballers
Deportivo Toluca F.C. players
Cruz Azul footballers
Club Necaxa footballers
Tecos F.C. footballers
Querétaro F.C. footballers
Association football midfielders